Maureen E. "Mo" Raymo  (born 1959) is an American paleoclimatologist and marine geologist. She is the Co-Founding Dean of the Columbia Climate School, Director of the Lamont–Doherty Earth Observatory of Columbia University, the G. Unger Vetlesen Professor of Earth & Environmental Sciences, and Director of the Lamont–Doherty Core Repository at the Lamont–Doherty Earth Observatory of Columbia University. She is the first female climate scientist and first female scientist to head the institution.

Raymo has done pioneering work on ice ages, the geologic temperature record, and climate, examining and theorizing about global cooling and warming and transitions in ice age cycles. Her work underlies fundamental ideas in paleoceanography including the uplift weathering hypothesis, the "41,000-year problem", the Pliocene sea-level paradox, and the Lisiecki-Raymo δ18O stack.

Among other awards and honors, Raymo became in 2014 the first woman to win the Wollaston Medal for geology, which had been awarded for 183 years at the time. She was described in her nomination as ".. one of the foremost and influential figures in the last 30 years".

Background
Raymo was born in Los Angeles and attended Brown University, receiving her Sc.B. Geology in 1982. She then attended Columbia University, where she earned her M.A. in geology in 1985, her M.Phil. in geology in 1988, and her Ph.D. in geology in 1989.

Research
Raymo is known for developing (along with William Ruddiman and Philip Froelich) the Uplift-Weathering Hypothesis. According to this hypothesis, tectonic uplift of areas such as the Tibetan plateau has contributed to surface cooling. During phases of mountain range formation, there are at the surface many minerals which can chemically interact with carbon dioxide. During the process of chemical weathering, there is a net removal of CO2 from the atmosphere, as a result of which the temperature on the ground decreases. She and her colleagues initially suggested that measuring the proportions of isotopes of strontium (Sr) in deep ocean sediments could substantiate the Uplift-Weathering Hypothesis but soon recognized that ambiguities in the sources of Sr to the ocean existed.  Over twenty years later, the hypothesis continues to be debated and studied.

Raymo is also well known for her interdisciplinary work, particularly using palaeoceanography to better understand the thermohaline circulation and pacing of ice ages over the Pleistocene and Pliocene and how they link to changes in orbital forcing and Milankovitch climate dynamics.  Raymo, along with her collaborator Lorraine Lisiecki, has made important contributions to palaeoclimate science and stratigraphic by means of oxygen isotope analysis of foraminifera from sample cores of deep ocean sediments including publishing the widely used 5 million year LR04 benthic foraminifera stable oxygen isotope stack record.

Awards and honors
Raymo is a fellow of the American Geophysical Union and the American Association for the Advancement of Science. In 2016 she was elected a member of the National Academy of Sciences. 
Raymo has won various prizes for her scientific work, including becoming in 2014 the first woman to be awarded the prestigious Wollaston Medal - the highest award of the Geological Society of London.
In 2014, she received the Milutin Milankovic Medal at the European Geosciences Union’s annual meeting for her use of geochemistry, geology and geophysics to solve paleoclimatology’s big problems. In 2019 she was awarded the Maurice Ewing Medal by the American Geophysical Union. In 2022 she was elected as a Member of the Royal Swedish Academy of Sciences, Class for Geosciences.

In 2002, she was included by the illustrated magazine Discover in a list of the 50 most important women in science and in her nomination for the Wollaston Medal, Professor James Scourse described her as ".. one of the foremost and influential figures in the last 30 years...She's been an important role model to women scientists—you can get to the top".

See also
 Timeline of women in science

References

External links
 
 Personal Website for Maureen Raymo
 Current projects of Maureen Raymo

Marine geologists
Paleoclimatologists
Date of birth missing (living people)
Living people
1959 births
American women geologists
Columbia University faculty
Lamont–Doherty Earth Observatory people
Fellows of the American Geophysical Union
Fellows of the American Association for the Advancement of Science
Members of the United States National Academy of Sciences
Wollaston Medal winners
21st-century American geologists
21st-century American scientists
21st-century American women scientists
Brown University alumni
Columbia University alumni
American women academics